Constance of Aragon (1239–1269) was a daughter of James I of Aragon and his second wife Yolanda of Hungary. She was a member of the House of Barcelona and was Infanta of Castile by her marriage to Manuel of Castile.

Her maternal grandparents were Andrew II of Hungary and his second wife Yolanda de Courtenay. Her paternal grandparents were Peter II of Aragon and Marie of Montpellier. Constance's siblings included: James II of Majorca, Peter III of Aragon, Yolanda, Queen of Castile and Isabella, Queen of France.

In 1260 and in Soria, Constance married Infante Manuel of Castile, the second son of Ferdinand III and his first wife Elisabeth of Hohenstaufen. The couple had at least two children:
 Alfonso Manuel (born 1260/1261, died in Montpellier, France in 1276) Died without issue.
 Violante Manuel (born 1265, died in Lisbon, Portugal in 1314), lady of Elche and Medellín. Married circa 1287 to Afonso of Portugal, son of Afonso III of Portugal.

Constance died in 1269, leaving her husband a widower. He remarried in 1274/5 to Beatrice of Savoy. Their son was Juan Manuel, Prince of Villena, who was successor to his father since Constance's son, Alfonso died young.

Ancestry

References 

1239 births
1269 deaths
13th-century Spanish women
13th-century people from the Kingdom of Aragon
House of Aragon
Aragonese infantas
Daughters of kings